Club Eden was the first electronic dance music club in Africa. Located at 54 Waterkant street in Cape Town, South Africa. 

Eden opened 1990 on Friday 29 November and ran for only one successful season, introducing a new era in nightlife for South Africa. It was conceived and founded by the UFO collective and a group of private investors. 

Inspired by the Second Summer of Love and rise of acid house music in the United Kingdom, Eden played a role in the early social re-integration of Cape Town nightlife, laying foundations for a post-apartheid club generation. Eden's introduction of Techno into the South African music scene helped lay the foundations for what later became Kwaito and the emerging Msanzi House Music scene.

External links
No Easy Rave To Freedom
Unofficial History of the African Hip Hop Movement

Cape Town culture
1990 establishments in South Africa